Jarellón is a caldera in the Andes, on the border between Bolivia and Chile which was discovered in 1975.

It has erupted dacite and rhyolite. The caldera and the associated stratovolcano of the same name are an important source of obsidian, which forms several large lava flows. This obsidian is known as the Laguna Blanca obsidian or Zapaleri obsidian.

References 

Pliocene calderas
Volcanoes of Chile
Volcanoes of Bolivia
Calderas of Chile